Saudade LP is a solo album by rapper producer Mr. J. Medeiros. It was released in 2011.

Track listing
"Fear and Safety" (featuring Bekah Wagner)	
"Saudade"
"The Weak End"
"Nothing Without Providence"
"Depression is a Liar"
"Stand Down" (featuring A Mouse Named Wolf)
"I'll Take It"
"Swallow" (featuring Logan)
"The Sailor"
"So" (featuring J Kyle Gregory)
"Neon Signs" (featuring Stro Elliot)
"Serious" (featuring Stro Elliot)
"THis is Not a Home"
"Shower Curtains (featuring J Kyle Gregory)

References

2011 albums
Mr. J. Medeiros albums